Dwarka District Court (South West Delhi) is one of the seven District Courts in the National Capital Territory of Delhi that function under the Delhi High Court. The Dwarka District Courts Complex is situated at Sector- 10, Dwarka, New Delhi Near by Dwarka Sector 10 Metro Station.

Information
The Dwarka District Courts Complex was inaugurated by the Hon’ble Chief Justice of India, Sh. K.G. Balakrishanan in the year of the 2008 on 6 September. Its functioning started since 08.09.2008 with its first district judge Sh.Inder Singh Mehta (I.S. Mehta). Apart from various Civil, Criminal, Motor accident and family Courts the functioning of 8 evening court is also operational. The Dwarka District Courts Complex includes two seven storied court room blocks building and one admin block building which are interconnected it also includes one 8 storied lawyers chamber block building.

References

External links
 Delhi District Courts: Dwarka Courts Complex

Government buildings in Delhi
Law enforcement in Delhi
South West Delhi district
Courthouses in India